Ville Husso (born 6 February 1995) is a Finnish professional ice hockey goaltender for the Detroit Red Wings of the National Hockey League (NHL). He has also played for the St. Louis Blues.

Playing career
Husso started his career in the youth setup at HIFK in his hometown of Helsinki. He made his debut with the club's men's team during the 2013–14 Liiga season. He reached the Liiga finals with HIFK in the 2015–16 season, where they fell short to Tappara. Husso excelled with a SVS% of .927 and a GAA of 1.91 that season, while receiving the Urpo Ylönen Award as the Goaltender of the Year. He also competed in the Champions Hockey League with HIFK.

St. Louis Blues
On 10 May 2016, he signed a three-year, entry-level contract with the St. Louis Blues of the National Hockey League (NHL).  After attending the Blues 2016 training camp, he was reassigned to AHL affiliate, the Chicago Wolves, on 29 September 2016.

Husso made his North American debut with the Wolves against the Grand Rapids Griffins on 15 October 2016 to begin the 2016–17 season. It was the first of two games he started in with the Chicago Wolves of the American Hockey League (AHL). Through the two AHL games, he posted a save percentage of .914 and a goals against of 2.53. He was reassigned to the Missouri Mavericks of the ECHL on 26 October 2016.  Husso thrived in net for the Mavericks, where he was fifth on the St. Louis Blues’ organizational goalie depth chart. On 23 December 2016, Husso earned his first pro shutout with 33 saves in a 4–0 victory over the Wichita Thunder. Husso returned to the Chicago Wolves in late December 2016, where he had continued success, posting a save percentage of .925 and goals against of 2.21 through five games played for the Wolves.

On 20 July 2019, the Blues re-signed Husso to a one-year, two-way contract extension.

In the pandemic shortened  season, on 31 January 2021, Husso recorded his first win in the NHL, in a 4–1 game over the Anaheim Ducks. On 12 May 2021, Husso recorded his first NHL shutout in a 4–0 win over the Minnesota Wild. The  season was a breakout for Husso, who began it as the backup goaltender to Jordan Binnington, but then saw his role expand as Binnington struggled. By the end of the regular season he had taken over the starting position, which in turn raised questions about the future of the team's goaltending, as Binnington was signed to a lengthy and expensive contract while Husso was to become a free agent. He finished the regular season with a 25–7–6	record and a .919 save percentage. The Blues qualified for the 2022 Stanley Cup playoffs, entering the first round as underdogs against the Minnesota Wild, with Husso starting in net. However, Husso did not perform well in the early games, and with the Blues down 2–1 in the series Binnington reclaimed the net and led the team on a three-game winning streak to clinch the series. Husso served as backup until Binnington was injured during the second round series against the Colorado Avalanche, at which point he reclaimed the net. The Blues were defeated by the Avalanche in six games, while Husso recorded a .890 save percentage in the postseason.

Detroit Red Wings
On 8 July 2022, Husso was traded at the 2022 NHL Entry Draft to the Detroit Red Wings in exchange for a third-round draft pick. He was immediately signed by the Red Wings to a three-year, $14.25 million contract. He would make 29 saves in his regular season debut with Detroit on October 14, 2022, earning a shutout in a 3–0 victory over the Montreal Canadiens.

International play

Husso was a member gold-winning of Team Finland at the 2014 World Junior Ice Hockey Championships, serving as a back-up goalie to Juuse Saros. He made two appearances in the tournament.

Career statistics

Regular season and playoffs

International

Awards and honours

References

External links

1995 births
Living people
Chicago Wolves players
Detroit Red Wings players
Finnish ice hockey goaltenders
HC Keski-Uusimaa players
HIFK (ice hockey) players
Missouri Mavericks players
St. Louis Blues draft picks
St. Louis Blues players
San Antonio Rampage players
Ice hockey people from Helsinki